Stumai Abdallah Athumani (born 25 August 1997) is a Tanzanian professional footballer who plays as a midfielder for JKT Queens and the Tanzania women's national team.

International career 
In 2018, Athumani was called up to the Tanzania women's national team. She scored one goal in their run to winning the 2018 CECAFA Women's Championship by scoring third goal in the goal in eventual 4–1 victory over Ethiopia.

 Athumani was selected for Tanzania's final 21-man squad for the 2021 COSAFA Women's Championship. She would go on to start in all five of Tanzania's games and play every minute.

On 4 October, in the final group stage game against fellow guest team South Sudan, Athumani scored a hat-trick which led to 3–0 win and qualification to the semi-final. In the semi-final she played the full 90 minutes as Tanzania won via 3–2 penalty shootout after the match ended in a 1–1 draw. On 15 July, she was named as a starter, as Tanzania beat Malawi 1–0 in the final to win the competition for the first time in history.

Honours 

 CECAFA Women's Championship: 2018
 COSAFA Women's Championship: 2021

References 

1997 births
Living people
Tanzanian women's footballers
Women's association football midfielders
Tanzania women's international footballers